Sombrero Verde was the first album of the band Sombrero Verde (now Maná).

Track listing

Personnel
 Fher Olvera – lead vocals, acoustic guitar and electric guitar
 Gustavo Orozco – electric guitar
 Juan Diego Calleros – bass
 Ulises Calleros – electric guitar, choir
 Abraham Calleros – drums, percussion

Additional personnel
 Adolfo Diaz – saxophone
 Raúl Garduño – keyboards
 Memo Espinoza and José Villar – trumpets

1981 debut albums